The Billingsley Farm is a historic place in Wadesboro, Florida, United States. It is located at 3640 Oakhurst Lane. On September 5, 2007, it was added to the U.S. National Register of Historic Places.

References

National Register of Historic Places in Leon County, Florida